Edward Francis Trevenen Brown KC (born January 1958) is an English barrister who specialises in international criminal law and human rights. He is one of the most senior prosecutors at the Old Bailey where he also served as a Recorder, as well as sitting as a part-time circuit judge at Southwark Crown Court. Brown has written extensively on gang violence and joint enterprise murder in The Times.

Career at the Bar
Brown was called to the Bar in 1983. He currently practises at QEB Hollis Whiteman in London, chambers of Mark Ellison KC, where he heads the specialist criminal department. After beginning his career both prosecuting and defending, Brown specialised in prosecution work from 1986, including several cases of murder, terrorism and organised crime. He took silk (i.e. appointed Queen's Counsel) in 2008. For most of his career he has practised at the Old Bailey.

Appointments
In 2000 Brown was appointed Junior Treasury Counsel at the Old Bailey, where he served as a recorder from 2001. In 2007 he was appointed Senior Treasury Counsel, serving in that capacity until 2014. In 2015 Brown became a Bencher of Gray's Inn.

Human rights
In 2014 Brown became a member of Detention Review Board of the United Nations Interim Administration Mission in Kosovo.

Defence
Brown has represented the prosecution, corporate entities and individuals in allegations of corporate crime, corruption, corporate manslaughter and tax investigations. In 2009 Brown acted for Labour Party politicians in Cash for Peerages police inquiry - no charges against MP's were brought. In 2016 Brown was appointed as leading Counsel to represent the CPS at the Independent Inquiry into Child Sexual Abuse.

Prosecution
Brown was instructed by the CPS in many of the highest profile British criminal cases including prosecution of Kevin Hutchinson-Foster who passed the BBM Bruni Model 92 handgun to Mark Duggan shortly before the minicab in which Duggan was travelling was stopped by police in Ferry Lane in Tottenham Hale.

Brown was also instructed in the inquest into Duggan's death. He prosecuted members of the GAS (Guns And Shanks) gang from Brixton who were charged with joint enterprise murder in a case of "vicious, shocking and sickening case of gang violence outside a school at a time when pupils and staff were gathering at the start of a school day", as well as Ben Hitchcock's murderers, whose actions were described as "the direct result of what was a pitched battle between rival gangs." Co-defendant Royston Thomas was found not guilty after police detectives relaunched an investigation into the stabbing of 16-year-old Ben Hitchcock.
He prosecuted David Jeffs known as the "Mayfair socialite murder", child killer Ben Butler, hitman Jamie Marsh-Smith who was found guilty of murdering a gang boss, and MI5 official Katharine Gun in a widely publicised case involving MI5 and GCHQ.

R v Jogee

In February 2016, Brown was interviewed by The Lawyer magazine to analyse R v Jogee that reversed previous case law on joint enterprise murder, after a recent Supreme Court ruling indicating that it was not right that a person could be convicted of murder and subsequently sentenced to life imprisonment if they foresaw the murder could take place but did not deliver the fatal blow. Brown commented: "It has always been the case that a person who intentionally assists another in a joint crime will be as guilty as the person who physically commits that crime. After the Chan Wing-Siu ruling in 1985, juries have since been directed that if a secondary party foresaw that the principal party might use a knife, for example, with intent to cause harm or murder, then they are guilty of murder as well."
Brown also commented that the judgment in R v Jogee and Ruddock v The Queen will have a significant effect on the prosecution of multi-handed crime, and in particular cases of multi-handed serious violence that sometimes results in death. It will also result in many applications for leave to appeal against conviction out of time.

Kevin Hutchinson-Foster

On 18 September 2012, Brown started prosecuting Kevin Hutchinson-Foster whose trial took place in Snaresbrook Crown Court. Duggan was shot dead while police officers were trying to arrest him in Tottenham, north London last August. The jury heard that the handgun allegedly supplied by Hutchinson-Foster was found near the spot where Duggan was shot. Giving evidence, Hutchinson-Foster who was accused of passing the gun to Mark Duggan, claimed Duggan already had a gun. Hutchinson-Foster is accused of "selling or transferring" a BBM Bruni Model 92 handgun to Duggan  contrary to the Firearms Act 1968, between 28 July and 5 August 2011. Hutchinson-Foster was found guilty of supplying a gun to Duggan. Chief Supt Dean Haydon, from the Metropolitan Police's Trident Serious Crime Command, said:

Shanks and Guns gang
In 2011 Brown prosecuted two south London gangs known as Shanks and Guns, or SG, and the Black Mafia, also known as the Sydenham Boys. Gang members were found guilty of murder of Nicholas "Nick" Pearton who was thought to be their friend. In May 2011 Pearton, 17 year old schoolboy, was stabbed by gangsters being caught up in a clash between two gangs in Home Park, Sydenham. Pearton was attacked when he went to the park to help gangsters who he thought were his friends, after receiving a call from them. The jury at the Old Bailey saw CCTV footage from the Kentucky Fried Chicken shop of an injured Nicholas running in and collapsing.
Prosecuting, Brown commented that Pearton was "the only white-skinned male participant in the incident" when he was chased and eventually killed by a pack of "animals." The court heard that hours earlier, Pearton's so-called friend, a member of Black Mafia gang known as the Sydenham Boys, had been involved in a row at school which led to a confrontation in the park between the two gangs.  Brown told the jury:
 Pearton's father said he suffers ‘overwhelming guilt’ and ‘emptiness’ since his son's murder.
Only one out of ten gangsters was identified as stabbing Pearton. The others claimed they had been wrongly convicted of murder and manslaughter. Belgian national Edward Conteh was convicted of Pearton's murder and deported after his conviction under joint enterprise law, whilst not being present at the scene. But Judge Anthony Morris said they had all taken part in "a terrifying example of gang violence". Morris also said not enough was being done to raise awareness of the consequences of gang violence. When the police commented that they already had a programme, Judge Morris said:

R v Hanad Mohammed
In 2016 Brown started prosecuting Hamad Mohammad and three of his associates who were accused of joint enterprise murder. Ionut Lazar, 28, was found shot dead in Shepherd's Bush on 22 October 2016 two days after arriving in the UK from Romania. Lazar, 28, was killed after "a number of men" forced their way into a home in Shepherd's Bush, west London Police were called to Askew Road, W11 on 22 October at 2.40am to reports of an unconscious male at a residential property in Askew Road. Lazar was found suffering from what was initially thought to be a stab wound to the chest. He died at the scene a short while later. A post-mortem examination took place 24 October at Fulham Mortuary and established the cause of death as a bullet wound to the chest.

Gintare Suminaite
In January 2017 Brown prosecuted Gintare Suminaite, 29-year-old mother from Crawley, West Sussex, who was charged with murder of her newborn child.
Prosecuting, Brown told the jury that the child was the product of Suminaite's secret affair with a fellow Lithuanian. Suminaite kept her pregnancy hidden from authorities and her long-term partner, with whom she already had a young child. She attended a hearing at Crawley magistrates' court but did not enter a plea to the murder charge.
Suminaite told police she "most likely" intended to kill her baby, but said she did not know why. At the trial held at the Old Bailey she pleaded guilty to a charge of infanticide.
The court heard that on 5 April 2016, Suminaite left work early saying she had "big problems" and gave birth in the bathroom at home, with her partner in another room. Her partner found Suminaite lying naked in the bathroom surrounded by blood and a baby bath full of what appeared to be clothes.
Jurors at the Old Bailey heard that Suminaite was bleeding and pale when found by her boyfriend who eventually called an ambulance after she confessed what had happened. The court heard that the child lay undiscovered as medics initially did not spot the body in the baby bath and the couple did not mention it. Suminaite was subsequently treated in hospital for significant blood loss and injury from childbirth. Following her arrest, Suminaite said she strangled her baby with her lingerie, but did not know why. She described giving birth quickly and easily and said the baby was moving and trying to cry. Suminaite told the jury she cut the umbilical cord with a razor then passed out in the bath. When she came to pick the baby up, she said the baby was not moving and she tied a pair of her knickers around her neck and put her in the baby bath.  She said she did not know why she did it as she had no mental problems. Emergency services were called to her home on Aldwick Road in Bognor. At the hearing, Mr Justice Nicol said that Suminaite's circumstances were "tragic in themselves". Sentencing Suminaite, he said:  Suminaite followed proceedings with the aid of a translator as English was not her first language. In his closing speech Brown acknowledged that Suminaite been emotionally and socially isolated during her life in England.

Suminaite was sentenced to a 24-month community order with a rehabilitation requirement order. At the completion of the trial Mr Justice Nicol said:

Jason Marshall
In August 2017, Brown prosecuted male escort Jason Marshall who murdered his client Peter Fasoli who he met in December 2012 through the social networking site Badoo, where he advertised his services under his "working" name "Gabriel".
Marshal, who pretended to be an MI6 agent, was filmed by a computer repairman Peter Fasolli who he murdered in a bondage sex session after which he tried to kill another man while on the run in Italy. Marshall was arrested after the Fasoli's relative found hidden footage of killing on his laptop. Peter Fasoli, a 58-year-old IT expert, who lived in a bungalow located near RAF Northolt was terrorised and murdered in 2013 at his own house by Marshall who was called over for an hour of a bondage sex session. On the opening day of his trial at the Old Bailey, Marshall was described as a "calculating and determined" killer. The court heard that during sexual roleplay, Marshall stripped the victim and arrested him for "being a spy" and hacking into a government laptop, the court heard. Fasoli was threatened with a knife and forced to hand over his cash card pin numbers. The footage shower Marshall, 28, calmly standing over the body of his client Peter Fasoli and signing "in the name of the father, the son and the Holy Ghost" in Latin, after killing him. Marshall subsequently set fire to Fasoli's home in attempt to make Fasoli's death look like an accident.

But two years later when Fasoli's nephew was sorting through his belongings, he was horrified to discover a computer file containing CCTV footage of the entire event.
The court heard how Marshall, who denied murder, first got in contact with Peter Fasoli in December 2012 through social networking site Badoo, inviting to set up a treesome and inventing the persona of a policeman.
Prosecuting, Mr Brown told jurors:

The Old Baily heard that Marshall arrived at the Fasoli's home at around 7pm on 6 January 2012, pretending to be a police officer kitted out with a police utility belt, handcuffs and a pistol holster.
During sexual role play, Marshall stripped the victim and arrested him for "being a spy" and hacking into a Government laptop, the court heard.
After Marshall fled the scene, he sent a "calculated and cynical" message to Fasoli on the Badoo chat line apologising for not seeing him the night before. He withdrew £750 in cash from the Fasoli's bank account and used his card to buy a flight to Rome. In February 2016 Marshal was arrested in Italy and extradited to United Kingdom to face trial for murder of Fasoli he committed four years ago. A Metropolitan Police spokesman commented: 
The court has heard that Fasoli accidentally filmed his own bondage sex session murder at the hands of Jason Marshall dressed as policeman. Jurors at the Old Bailey watched footage of Fasoli begging for his life as he was attacked by fantasist Marshall while classical music played in the background. Camera footage showed Fasioli becoming visibly distressed as he was gagged and bound on his bed. He was threatened with a large hunting knife and forced to hand over his cash card pin numbers, the court heard. Prosecuting, Brown told the jury: 

The court heard that during psychological evaluation Marshall told the psychiatrists that he is an incarnation of Archangel Gabriel and stated "You can't judge me, only God can judge me." In September 2017 Jason Marshall was imprisoned for 39 years for the murder of Peter Fasoli.
He  has previously been convicted in the UK of impersonating MI5 and transport police officials while carrying out searches and of issuing fines on the Tube.

SFO
 In 2016 Brown represented Serious Fraud Office in a widely publicised case involving four former Barclays executives who were charged with fraud. and unlawful financial assistance over a $3 billion loan the bank made to Qatar's finance and economy ministry.
 In 2017 Brown acted as a district attorney for the SFO in the Barclays case which was among the most high-profile cases ever to be brought by the SFO.

Trusteeships and patronages
In 2011 Brown became a trustee of the Growing Against Violence, charity that delivers programmes in schools that address gang exploitation and seeks to educate young people and draw them away from gangs and violence. Brown also gave lectures to young south London gang members on law of joint enterprise and on the dangers of gang violence.

Notable appearances

Guilty by Association
In September 2015 Brown, in his capacity of Senior Treasury Counsel, appeared on Guilty by Association, a BBC One documentary that examines law of joint enterprise. The programme raised questions about how the courts deal with gang violence, what constitutes a murder and whether young people are being sentenced for crimes they did not commit. Documentary follows Alex and his family as he is charged under the joint enterprise law and examines the increasing controversy surrounding the details of this law which some believe is creating criminals of the innocent.

External links
 Police Oracle: Edward Brown QC
 Edward Brown QC - insights, professional opinion and honest testimony on the subject of gang members and knives.
 Edward Brown QC - Guilty by Association documentary which follows Alex and his family as he is charged with joint enterprise murder
 - The Barristers, documentary
 - Common, BBC One film based on the UK's controversial joint enterprise law.

See also

 List of Supreme Court of Judicature cases
 Protection from Harassment Act 1997

References

Living people
Lawyers from London
English King's Counsel
21st-century King's Counsel
Members of the Inner Temple
1958 births
Members of Gray's Inn
20th-century English lawyers
Public defenders
Government lawyers
Immigration lawyers
Legal educators
British civil rights activists
Criminal defense lawyers
British legal writers
Human rights lawyers
English human rights activists
British prosecutors
21st-century English judges